Sanford L. Steelman Jr. (born September 11, 1951) is an American judge, who served on the North Carolina Court of Appeals from January 2003 until his retirement in June 2015.

Steelman attended Davidson College, graduating with a degree in political science in 1973 and having spent a year abroad at the University of East Anglia. He then completed his Juris Doctor degree at the University of North Carolina at Chapel Hill in 1976. He worked in private practice in Monroe, North Carolina until 1994, when he became a North Carolina Superior Court judge. In 2002, Steelman was elected to an eight-year term on the North Carolina Court of Appeals as a Republican, and in 2010, he was re-elected without opposition.

He is married and has three sons.

Notes

External links
 Official biography
 Judgepedia entry

1951 births
Living people
Davidson College alumni
University of North Carolina School of Law alumni
Alumni of the University of East Anglia
North Carolina Court of Appeals judges
People from Monroe, North Carolina